Frederick Thellusson may refer to:

Frederick Thellusson, 4th Baron Rendlesham (1798–1852), MP for Suffolk East
Frederick Thellusson, 5th Baron Rendlesham (1840–1911), MP for Suffolk East, son of the above

See also
 Baron Rendlesham